Charles Leonard Richards (born March 19, 1945) is a retired American modern pentathlete. He competed at the 1972 Summer Olympics and placed ninth individually and fourth with the team.

A graduate of Indiana University where he was a two-time All-American, Richards later moved to Portland, Oregon where he opened a health club, the Cornell Court Club (later renamed the Sunset Athletic Club) in 1977. In 2009, Richards was inducted into the Oregon Sports Hall of Fame for his advocacy of sports, fitness, and the Hall of Fame itself.

References

External links
 

1945 births
Living people
American male modern pentathletes
Olympic modern pentathletes of the United States
Modern pentathletes at the 1972 Summer Olympics
Sportspeople from Tacoma, Washington
Indiana Hoosiers men's track and field athletes
Track and field athletes from Portland, Oregon
20th-century American people
21st-century American people